The Companion Animal Parasite Council (CAPC, commonly pronounced "Cap-Cee") is a non-profit organization (501c3) composed of practicing veterinarians, academic veterinary parasitologists, veterinary technicians, state public health veterinarians, and staff from the Centers for Disease Control and Prevention who are dedicated to reducing the numbers of parasites in dogs and cats along with reducing the risk of transmitting these parasites and diseases to humans.

The group is sponsored mainly by industrial sponsors that are devoted to maintaining the health of pets through improved parasiticides and diagnostics that can be used by practitioners and clients in a safe and consumer-friendly manner.

Academic Veterinary Parasitologists 
 Dr. Byron Blagburn, Auburn University
 Dr. Dwight D. Bowman, Cornell University
 Dr. Michael Yabsley, University of Georgia
 Dr. Heather Walden, University of Florida

Practitioners 
 Dr. Jay Stewart, Oregon
 Dr. Craig Prior, Tennessee
 Dr. Rick Marrinson, Florida
 Dr. Scott Stevenson, Ontario

Public Health Veterinarian 
 Dr. Emilio DeBess, Oregon

Veterinary Technician 
 Holly Morss, Washington

Other Academics
 Dr. Robert Lund, Clemson University

CDC Liaison 
 Dr. Patricia Wilkins, Georgia

Executive Director 
 Dr. Chris Carpenter

Recent publications include a series of articles on a number of diseases that impact both animals and people developed from a workshop composed of members of CAPC along with members of the American Association of Veterinary Parasitologists and the Centers of Disease Control and Prevention.  The articles appeared in February 2010 in Trends in Parasitology.  This series of articles discusses giardiasis, cryptosporidiosis, toxoplasmosis, toxocariasis, hookworms disease, dirofilariasis (heartworm), baylisascariasis, tick and flea transmitted zoonotic diseases affecting people and animals.  Another publication on fleas and ticks that includes authors who are present and past CAPC members is "The Biology, Treatment, and Control of Flea and Tick Infestations."

References

Bibliography 
 Roger W Stich, I. Craig Prior, "Recommendations from the Companion Animal Parasite Council CANINE ARTHROPODS: MITES & TICKS", TODAY’S VETERINARY PRACTICE, March 2015, online.
 Rebecca J. Straub, "Toward the formation of a Companion Animal Parasite Council for the Tropics (CAPCT)", Parasit Vectors. 2015; 8: 271., online

Further reading

External links 
 capcvet.org

Parasitology
Zoonoses